Siah Kala Mahalleh (also Romanized as Sīāh Kalā Maḩalleh and Sīāh Kolā Maḩalleh; also known as Sīāh Kalā Maḩalleh-ye Sharqī, Sīāh Kolā Maḩalleh-ye Sharqī, Sukra Mahalleh, and Surkh Mahalleh) is a village in Ganjafruz Rural District, in the Central District of Babol County, Mazandaran Province, Iran. At the 2006 census, its population was 3,854, in 1,045 families.

References 

Populated places in Babol County